Lazar Naroditsky (18 December 1937 – 24 October 2000) was a Ukrainian middle-distance runner. He competed in the men's 3000 metres steeplechase at the 1964 Summer Olympics, representing the Soviet Union.

References

External links

1937 births
2000 deaths
Athletes (track and field) at the 1964 Summer Olympics
Soviet male middle-distance runners
Soviet male steeplechase runners
Ukrainian male middle-distance runners
Ukrainian male steeplechase runners
Olympic athletes of the Soviet Union